The Philippines participated and hosted the 1954 Asian Games held in the capital city of Manila. The country ranked 2nd with 14 gold medals, 14 silver medals and 17 bronze medals with a total of 45 medals to secure its second spot in the medal tally.

Asian Games performance
Boxing produced five gold medals, while swimming and shooting added four golds each. The basketball squad also won the gold medal.

Martin Gison bagged one gold medal in rapid fire pistol, two silvers in small bore rifle and free rifle, and one bronze medal in small bore rifle.

The gold medalists in boxing included Ernesto Sajo (flyweight), Alejandro Ortuoste (bantamweight), Celedonio Espinosa (lightweight), Ernesto Porto (light welterweight), and Vicente Tunacao (middleweight). Two female swimmers - Haydee Coloso and Jocelyn von Giese - made a sensational debut with golden performances in their respective events.

Medalists

Gold

Silver

Bronze

Multiple

Medal summary

Medal by sports

References

Nations at the 1954 Asian Games
1954
Asian Games